William S. Kaufman (1849–1916) was an American architect known for designing a number of public buildings, primarily in Indiana and Ohio.

Life and work
Kaufman was born in Union County, Indiana to Elias and Mary (Rhodes) Kaufman, who were Pennsylvania natives and early Indiana settlers.  He attended school in Brownsville, Indiana and trained as a carpenter and stair-builder in Cambridge City, Indiana. He studied architectural drafting in Indianapolis and remained there until 1876, when he moved to New Castle and opened an office, later moving his practice to Richmond, Indiana.  His son, Thomas, joined him in the architecture business for a time and then moved to Indianapolis and later to California with his wife, the noted Ragtime composer May Aufderheide Kaufman.  A daughter, Maude Kaufman Eggemeyer became an accomplished artist of the Richmond Group of painters.

Notable works

 Westmoreland County Courthouse, Greensburg, Pennsylvania
 The Westcott Hotel, Richmond, Indiana (demolished)
 Richmond State Hospital, Richmond, Indiana (superintendent of construction for architect E. H. Ketcham
 Lindley Hall at Earlham College (burned)
 Parry Hall at Earlham College
 Fayette County, Indiana Courthouse, Connersville, Indiana renovation
 Wayne County Courthouse (Indiana) (superintendent of construction for architect James McLaughlin
 Winchester, Indiana Friends Meeting House
 Wysor Street Depot, Muncie, Indiana
 Greenville Carnegie Library, Greenville, Ohio
 Central Christian Church, Lebanon, Indiana
 Henry Henley Public Library, Carthage, Indiana

Sources
Tomlan, Mary Raddant and Michael A.  Richmond, Indiana: Its Physical and Aesthetic Heritage to 1920, Indianapolis: Indiana Historical Society, 2003
Kieser, David L. "Carthage Historic District Study", Indianapolis: Kieser Consulting Group, LLC, 2015

External links

1849 births
1916 deaths
Architects from Indiana
Artists from Richmond, Indiana
Burials at Earlham Cemetery, Richmond, Indiana
People from Union County, Indiana
People from New Castle, Indiana